Robert Thorndike may refer to:

Robert L. Thorndike (1910-1990), American psychologist
Robert M. Thorndike (born 1943), American psychologist